Mossley is a civil parish in Tameside, Greater Manchester, England, and includes the small town of Mossley and the surrounding countryside.  The parish contains 50 listed buildings that are recorded in the National Heritage List for England.  All the listed buildings are designated at Grade II, the lowest of the three grades, which is applied to "buildings of national importance and special interest".

Mossley was originally a rural and agricultural area, and in the 18th and early 19th century houses were adapted for handloom weaving.  Some of these buildings have survived and are listed.  The Huddersfield Narrow Canal passes through the parish, and listed buildings associated with this include bridges, locks, a milestone, and the entrances to a tunnel.  The other listed buildings include houses, farmhouses, farm buildings, a public house, a former mill, a former town hall, a church and its lychgate, and a war memorial.


Buildings

Notes and references

Notes

Citations

Sources

Lists of listed buildings in Greater Manchester